Leroy Young, (born August 7, 1967 in Belize City, Belize), otherwise known as "The Grandmaster", is a Belizean dub poet.

Biography and arts career 
Young was born to Bernadean Young and attended St. Mary's Primary and the former St. Michael's College, now amalgamated into Anglican Cathedral College (ACC). He briefly starred in rap group Fresh Breeze with the Morgan Brothers, Kenny and Turbo, but eventually became addicted to drugs and got into various misdeeds, resulting in a trip to rehab after twice attempting to commit suicide. In the late 1990s, after spending time in prison and drug rehabilitation, he turned to poetry and received a segment in the news broadcast on Channel 7 television station, improvising poems about stories in the news and whatever else.

He parlayed his time on Channel 7 into two books of poetry, Made in Pinks Alley and Generation X. His debut album Just Like That... was released on Stonetree Records in 2004. In 2017, the Image Factory Art Foundation released a DVD retrospective covering Young's career as a poet.

Young is a supporter of the People's United Party and appears on their radio station every Thursday hosting a show dedicated to the arts, "G2" (the other G standing for cohost Angela Gegg).

References

External links 
 the documentary Welcome To My World
 rootsworld.com album review
 belizetimes.bz article
 Description of album Just Like That

1967 births
Living people
People from Belize City
Belizean poets
Belizean musicians
Belizean media personalities
People's United Party
Dub poets
21st-century Belizean writers